The KAIF Trophy is annual international women's association football club competition. The tournament organised by the Austrian Football Association, and will involve the top women's club teams of association members nations. The tournament severe as a preparation for the UEFA Women's Champions League

History

Results

Top goalscorers

References

External links

 football in Austria